Sexton Blake and the Bearded Doctor is a 1935 British mystery film directed by George A. Cooper and starring George Curzon, Henry Oscar and Tony Sympson. It is based on the novel The Blazing Launch Murder by Rex Hardinge, and was one of George Curzon's three big screen outings as the fictional detective.

Premise
Sexton Blake investigates the death of a top classical musician.

Cast
 George Curzon - Sexton Blake 
 Henry Oscar - Doctor Gibbs 
 Tony Sympson - Tinker 
 Gillian Maude - Janet 
 Philip Ray - Jim Cameron 
 John Turnbull - Inspector Donnell 
 Edward Dignon - Hawkins 
 James Knight - Red 
 Donald Wolfit - Percy

References

External links

1935 films
British mystery films
1935 mystery films
Films based on British novels
Films directed by George A. Cooper
British black-and-white films
British detective films
Films based on crime novels
Sexton Blake films
1930s English-language films
1930s British films